The women's heptathlon event at the 2005 Summer Universiade was held on 15–16 August in Izmir, Turkey.

Results

References
Finals results
Full results

Heptathlon
2005 in women's athletics
2005